List of Syrian television series.

1960s 
 The happy vacation (1960)
 Bubbles (1963)
 Mokhtar alsaba' bahrat (1969)
 Fae to face

1970s

 Sah Al-Noom

1980s
 Maraya

1990s
 Al-Ababeed
 Al Maout Al Kadem Ila Al Sharq
Nihayat Rajol Shoja' (1994; adapted from the novel)

2000s

 Al-Taghreba al-Falastenya 
Old Times
Ash-Shatat
Saqf al-Alam
Salah Al-deen Al-Ayyobi
Bab Al-Hara 
Seraa Ala El Remal
Zaman Al'ar
De'ah Da'iah
Saqr Qoraish
Rabee' Qortoba
Mulouk Al-Tawa'ef
Al-Zeer Salem

2010s
 Mawqef Micro
 Forbidden Love

References

External links
 Works produced in "Syria" - elcinema

Syrian television series
Syria